Donald Shaw Bowie (born 14 April 1940) was a Scottish footballer who played for Rangers, Dumbarton, Stirling Albion and Stenhousemuir.

References

1940 births
Scottish footballers
Dumbarton F.C. players
Stirling Albion F.C. players
Rangers F.C. players
Stenhousemuir F.C. players
Scottish Football League players
Living people
Association football wingers